The Savoia-Marchetti S.56 was an Italian single-engine biplane flying boat trainer and tourer, built by Savoia-Marchetti.

Of unequal span, the upper longer than the lower, of wooden construction. Instructor and student sat side by side in separate cockpits, with dual controls; a third cockpit was located just aft that. It used a 52 kW (70 hp) Anzani.

The S.56A had a slightly longer span and 60 kW (80 hp) Anzani, and was turned into an amphibian by addition of manually retractable landing gear. Private owners and flying clubs purchased at least 12, and Regia Aeronautica operated four (differing in engine specification, including 96 kW {115 hp} FIAT A.53, 101 kW {135 hp} FIAT A.54, and Walter Venus radial engines, among others).

The S.56A proved popular in the U.S., and the American Aeronautical Corporation (AAC) set up licence production in 1929, relying on the 67 kW (90 hp) Kinner K5 radials for power for three two-place aircraft and over 40 three-seaters.

This was followed in 1930 by the S.56B, powered by the 93 kW (125 hp) Kinner B-5, with an enclosed cockpit. Another was converted to a single-seater and given additional fuel tanks, as the S.56C, for an attempted round-the-world flight by American businessman Smith Reynolds.

In 1931, the Budd Company built an all-metal S.56 as the Budd BB-1 Pioneer.

Operators

Military operators

Regia Aeronautica

United States Army Air Corps

Royal Romanian Naval Aviation

Civilian and government operators

New York City Police Department operated 6 biplanes built under license in the US by American Aeronautical Corporation

Aircraft on display

NC349N, built under licence in the US by American Aeronautical Corporation and used by police during the Prohibition years to intercept rum smugglers is in the Cradle of Aviation Museum, Long Island, New York.
A restored S.56 is on display at the Carolinas Aviation Museum located at Charlotte Douglass International Airport, in Charlotte, North Carolina.

Specifications (S.56B)

See also

References

Notes

Bibliography

 
 

This page contains material originally created for Savoia-Marchetti S.56
S.56
1920s Italian civil utility aircraft
Flying boats
Biplanes
Amphibious aircraft
Single-engined tractor aircraft
Aircraft first flown in 1924